The Sanremo Music Festival 2022 was the 72nd edition of the annual Sanremo Music Festival, a television song contest held in the Teatro Ariston of Sanremo, organised and broadcast by RAI. The show was held between 1 and 5 February 2022, and was presented for the third time in a row by Amadeus, who also served as the artistic director for the competition, alongside a number of co-hosts. It was won by Mahmood and Blanco with "".

Format
The 2022 edition of the Sanremo Music Festival took place at the Teatro Ariston in Sanremo, Liguria, organized by the Italian public broadcaster RAI. The artistic director and the presenter for the competition was Amadeus, for the third consecutive year.

The venue returned to its full capacity during the festival, after the presence of an audience was not allowed in the previous edition due to the COVID-19 pandemic.

Presenters
In August 2021, RAI officially confirmed Amadeus as the presenter of the 72nd edition of the Sanremo Music Festival. Together with Amadeus, five co-hosts alternated during the five evenings: Ornella Muti, Lorena Cesarini, Drusilla Foer, Maria Chiara Giannetta and Sabrina Ferilli.

Besides these, Orietta Berti and Fabio Rovazzi hosted parts of the show (for sponsorship reasons) from the cruise ship Costa Toscana off the shore of Sanremo.

Voting
Voting occurred through the combination of three methods:
 Public televoting, carried out via landline, mobile phone, the contest's official mobile app, and online voting.
 Jury of the press room, TV, radio and web.
 Demoscopic jury, composed by 1000 music fans who vote from their homes via an electronic voting system managed by Ipsos.

Their voting was articulated as follows:

 First two nights: half of the entrants were judged by three separate panels from the jury of the press room, TV, radio and web.
 Third night: all of the entrants were judged through a 50/50 split system by means of televoting and the demoscopic jury. The results were combined with those of the previous nights.
 Fourth night: the same systems used on the first three nights were put in place.
 Fifth night: the entrants were judged by televoting alone, to be added up to the results obtained that far; ultimately, a final voting round (again a sum of televoting and the two juries) was held among the top 3, which determined the winner.

Selections

Sanremo Giovani 2021
Unlike previous editions, the Newcomers' section was not included in the Festival, but a similar selection was held to decree the three places reserved in the Big Artist section.

Standard selection 
On 20 October 2021, the RAI commission for Sanremo Music Festival 2022 announced a list of 711 acts, but only 30 artists coming from all Italian regions – excluding Basilicata and Valle d'Aosta – and from abroad were selected in the first phase.

On 22 November 2021, the RAI commission announced the eight finalists.

 Bais – ""
 Esseho – ""
 Martina Beltrami – ""
 Matteo Romano – ""

 Oli? – ""
 Samia – ""
 Tananai – ""
 Yuman – ""

Area Sanremo 
After the auditions, a RAI commission – composed by Amadeus, Gianmarco Mazzi, Claudio Fasulo, Massimo Martelli and Leonardo de Amicis – identified 4 finalists for the competition among the 330 acts:

 Destro – ""
 Littamè – ""

 Senza_Cri – ""
 Vittoria – ""

Final 
On 15 December 2021, the twelve finalists performed their songs at Sanremo Casino in Sanremo, with the show  2021 broadcast on Rai 1 and presented by Amadeus. The three winners of the night, i.e. Yuman, Tananai and Matteo Romano, participated in Sanremo 2022 with a new entry.

Big Artists

Competing entries

Shows

First night 
The first twelve artists each performed their song.

Second night 
The remaining thirteen artists each performed their song.

Third night 
All of the twenty-five artists performed their songs once again.

Fourth night 
The artists each performed a cover of a song from the '60s, '70s, '80s, or '90s. They could either perform alone or duet with a guest performer.

Fifth night 
All of the artists performed their songs one last time, with the top three moving on to the final round of voting.

Controversies
On 31 January 2022, director of Rai 1  publicly announced through a press conference that there would be no vaccine mandate for the Sanremo Music Festival 2022 singers as it would have breached the singers' right to privacy on their health status. This was highly criticized by the Italian public, resulting into a second declaration by Coletta, claiming that there was a "misunderstanding" and that the singers would also be required to show their proof of vaccination upon entrance at the festival.

Special guests
The special guests of Sanremo Music Festival 2022 included:

 Singers / musicians: Arisa, Cesare Cremonini, Colapesce & Dimartino, Ermal Meta, Gaia, Jovanotti, Laura Pausini, Malika Ayane, Måneskin, Marco Mengoni, Massimo Alberti, Meduza & Hozier, Mika, Orietta Berti, Pinguini Tattici Nucleari
 Actors / comedians / directors / models: Anna Valle, Checco Zalone, Claudio Gioè, Filippo Scotti, Gaia Girace, Lino Guanciale, Margherita Mazzucco, Nino Frassica, Raoul Bova, Rosario Fiorello
 Sports people: Elisa Balsamo, Matteo Berrettini,  (Agnese Duranti, Alessia Maurelli, Daniela Mogurean, Martina Centofanti, Martina Santandrea)

Broadcast and ratings

Local broadcast 
Rai 1 and Rai Radio 2 brought the official broadcasts of the festival in Italy. The five evenings were also streamed online via the broadcaster's official website RaiPlay, which made it available in all member countries of the European Broadcasting Union, since the festival is broadcast on the Eurovision network.

Ratings

Notes

References 

2022 in Italian television
2022 song contests
February 2022 events in Italy
Eurovision Song Contest 2022
Sanremo Music Festival by year